Benjamin S. Halpern is a marine biologist and ecologist currently working at the University of California, Santa Barbara and was the recipient of the 2016 A.G. Huntsman Award for Excellence in the Marine Sciences.

Early life and education 
Halpern earned his B.A. from Carleton College in 1995 and earned a Ph.D. from the University of California, Santa Barbara in 2003.

Career 
Halpern, who works at UCSB's Bren School of Environmental Science & Management was featured in Nature for his team's scientific collaboration on the southern tip of Australia's Great Barrier Reef in 2012.  He has also been published in Nature and is an advocate of integrating marine protected areas into networks.

He is recognized for marine conservation and resource management and is the recipient of the 2016 A.G. Huntsman Award for Excellence in the Marine Sciences.

References

External links 
 
 Interview with The Guardian

Living people
Carleton College alumni
University of California, Santa Barbara alumni
American marine biologists
American ecologists
University of California, Santa Barbara faculty
Year of birth missing (living people)